The hulusi (traditional: 葫蘆絲; simplified: 葫芦丝; pinyin: húlúsī), also known as the cucurbit flute and the gourd flute is a free reed wind instrument from China, Vietnam and the Shan State and by the indigenous people of Assam. It is held vertically and has three bamboo pipes that pass through a Calabash gourd wind chest; the center pipe has finger holes and the outer two are typically drone pipes. It is not uncommon for a hulusi to have only one drone pipe while the second outer pipe is merely ornamental. The drone pipe has a finger hole which allows it to be stopped. Advanced configurations have keyed finger holes similar to a clarinet or oboe, which can greatly extend the range of the hulusi to several octaves.

The hulusi was originally used primarily in the Shan State of Myanmar, Yunnan province and Assam by a number of ethnic-minority groups, in particular the Dai people who call the instrument "pi lamtao" (筚朗叨 – the word "pi" means woodwind instruments, and the word "lamtao"(namtao) means gourd), and has gained nationwide popularity throughout China and is also used by various indigenous ethnic groups of Assam; similar to the popularity of the harmonica in the West, and "improved" versions have been produced outside the indigenous realms. In Vietnam, the instrument is referred to as the "Sáo Bầu", which means Gourd Flute. Like the related free reed pipe called bawu, the hulusi has a very pure, very mellow clarinet-like sound.

A similar instrument called hulusheng is a mouth organ with a gourd wind chest.

Etymology
The instrument's name comes from the Mandarin Chinese word húlu (葫蘆絲/葫芦丝), meaning "Calabash gourd," and si, meaning "silk" (referring to the instrument's smooth tone).HULUSI  The instrument is called pi lamtao in the Dai (Tai Nuea) language of Dehong and "pi namtao" in Lue language (Sipsong Panna), Khun language (Kengtung), Yuan language (Northern Thailand), Lao language and Thai language. It is also called Huluxi in Assam.hulusi

Performers
Although the hulusi is still predominantly performed in Yunnan (China), Shan State (Myanmar) and Assam it has in recent years been adopted by European composers and performers. Rohan Leach and Jack Reddick from England, Raphaël De Cock from Belgium, Sara Bentes from Brazil, Nadishana from Russia and Herman Witkam from the Netherlands have all taken the instrument in new directions.

References

External links
Hulusi page from Pat Missin site
Hulusi page from ASZA.com site

Video
Hulusi video from The Musical Instruments E-book

See also
Bawu
Traditional Squares
Pungi, a similar Indian instrument

Chinese musical instruments
Free reed aerophones
Culture in Yunnan